Mohit Aron (born 1973), is an Indian-American computer scientist, businessman and entrepreneur.

Life
Aron was born about 1973 and grew up in Chandigarh.
He graduated with a bachelor of technology in computer science from the Indian Institute of Technology Delhi in 1995.
Aron graduated with an MS in 1998 and a PhD in computer science from Rice University in 2001. with a focus on distributed computing.
His advisor was Peter Druschel.

In 2000 he joined a company called Zambeel.
He was a developer on the Google File System engineering project from 2003 to 2007.
From 2007 to 2009 he worked at Aster Data Systems.
Aron is a promoter of the term hyper-converged infrastructure

Aron co-founded Nutanix in 2009.
Aron was recognized by CRN Magazine in 2012.
Aron founded Cohesity in 2013. 
In July and August 2016, CRN mentioned Cohesity.

References

1973 births
Living people
Businesspeople from California
Rice University alumni
IIT Delhi alumni
Google employees